Gritzner is a surname. Notable people with this surname include:

 Erich Gritzner (1874–1963), German heraldist, genealogist, and sigillographer
 James E. Gritzner (born 1947), American judge
 Maximilian Gritzner (1842–1902), German heraldist